The Aviator Monument is a statue that stands at Karlaplan in central Stockholm, Sweden. The statue was a gift from the Swedish Aeronautical Society in memory of different Swedish aviation pioneers who fell in both the North Pole expedition of 1898 and in the Swedish aviator era in 1917. The task to build the monument was given to the famous sculptor Carl Milles. The Aviator Monument was finished in 1931.

The statue
The monument is a sculpture of a large eagle with outstretched wings about to lift. Height 185 cm, width 750 cm and depth 185 cm. On the plinth which the statue is standing on are reliefs of Icarus, balloonists and early warplanes. Milles thought that an eagle would be an excellent symbol. Inside the shallow monument there is an urn, which contains medals for each fallen Swedish pilot.

History
Based on his sympathy towards Hitler, some art historians think that the Aviator Monument is an expression of Carl Milles admiration for Nazism. The eagle with its outstretched wings is often associated with the Nazi symbol, The Nazi Eagle. In the 1940s, young Swedish Nazis used the monument as a meeting point, and a place for gathering and commemoration. During this time young socialists sabotaged the statue with graffiti in protests against Nazis. The Swedish Air Force used it as a monument for a wreath-laying ceremony. 

The original purpose of this statue is to honour fallen pilots such as Salomon August Andrée, Nils Strindberg and Knut Fraenkel who died in the North Pole expedition in 1898. The monument was taken down during the construction of the Karlaplan metro station and re-erected again in 1967.

References

External links
jr4it
spfkarlaplan
millesmonument

Monuments and memorials in Sweden
Outdoor sculptures in Stockholm
1931 sculptures
Bronze sculptures in Sweden
Sculptures of birds
Sculptures by Carl Milles
Vandalized works of art in Sweden
Aviation art